UPML may refer to:
 Ukrainian Physics and Mathematics Lyceum, a high school in Kyiv, Ukraine.
 Uniaxial Perfectly Matched Layer, numerical truncation methodology.